The 14th Legislative Assembly of Ontario was in session from June 29, 1914, until September 23, 1919, just prior to the 1919 general election. The majority party was the Ontario Conservative Party  led by Sir James P. Whitney.

William Howard Hearst became party leader and Premier after the death of James P. Whitney in September 1914.

David Jamieson served as speaker for the assembly.

Members elected to the Assembly
Italicized names indicate members returned by acclamation.

Timeline

References

External links
Members in Parliament 14 

Terms of the Legislative Assembly of Ontario
1914 establishments in Ontario
1919 disestablishments in Ontario